Pyroderces albistrigella is a moth in the family Cosmopterigidae. It is found in North America, where it has been recorded from Florida and Mississippi. It is also found in the West Indies and Puerto Rico.

The wingspan is about 15 mm. Adults have been recorded on wing from May to October and in December.

References

Natural History Museum Lepidoptera generic names catalog

albistrigella
Moths described in 1890